Chilblains, also known as pernio, is a medical condition in which damage occurs to capillary beds in the skin, most often in the hands or feet, when blood perfuses into the nearby tissue, resulting in redness, itching, inflammation, and possibly blisters.  It occurs most frequently when predisposed individuals, predominantly women, are exposed to cold and humidity. Ulcerated chilblains are referred to as kibes. Temperature-related chilblains can be prevented by keeping the feet and hands warm in cold weather and avoiding exposing these areas to extreme temperature changes. Once  the  diagnosis  of  chilblains is made, first-line treatment includes avoiding cold, damp environments and wearing gloves and warm socks.

Chilblains can be idiopathic (spontaneous and unrelated to another disease), but similar symptoms may also be a manifestation of another serious medical condition that must be investigated. Related medical conditions include Raynaud syndrome, erythromelalgia, frostbite, and trench foot, as well as connective tissue diseases such as lupus or vasculitis. In infants affected by Aicardi–Goutières syndrome (a rare inherited condition which affects the nervous system) chilblain-like symptoms occur together with severe neurologic disturbances and unexplained fevers.

Signs and symptoms 

The areas most affected are the toes, fingers, earlobes, nose.
 Blistering of affected area
 Burning and itching sensation in extremities
 Dermatitis in extremities
 Ulceration (severe cases only)
 Erythema (blanchable redness of the skin)
 Pain in affected area
 Skin discoloration, red to dark blue

Chilblains caused by exposure to low temperatures usually heal within 7–14 days.

Prevention

Exposure 
 Keep affected area warm, and avoid any extreme temperature changes (including very hot water).
 Keep affected area dry.
 Wear warm shoes, socks and gloves.
 Wear a hat and a scarf to protect the ears and the nose.
 Avoid tight fitting socks/shoes.

Other 
 Exercise at least four times a week to improve circulation.
 Quit smoking, as it damages circulation.

Treatment 
 Nifedipine and amlodipine, which are vasodilators in the class of drugs known as calcium channel blockers, may help in some cases. Vasodilation may reduce pain, facilitate healing, and prevent recurrences. It is typically available in an oral pill but can be compounded into a topical formula.
 Diltiazem, a vasodilator, may help.
 Apply a mixture of friar's balsam and a weak iodine solution.

History
The medieval Bald's Leechbook recommended treating chilblains with a mixture of eggs, wine, and fennel root.  A modern-day home remedy is to put garlic on the chilblains.  While neither of these remedies has been supported by scientific research, vasodilating, rubiefacient and warming herbal remedies, both topical and internal are prescribed and efficacious.

COVID-19 
Chilblain-like symptoms have also been linked to COVID-19. COVID toes, as they are commonly known, have mostly been reported in older children and adolescents, who often have not had other symptoms of COVID-19. The symptoms are usually mild and disappear without treatment. Their cause is debated: it is uncertain whether COVID toes are a delayed consequence of the viral infection itself or are, at least partially, connected to environmental factors during the COVID-19 pandemic. They may share some of the microscopic features of chilblains caused by lupus. It has been suggested that in the absence of exposure to cold and damp, COVID-19 should be considered as a possible cause of chilblains.

In a study at the dermatology department of Saint-Louis Hospital in Paris, researchers found that most of their study participants carried high levels of autoantibodies, proteins generated by the immune system that inadvertently attack the body's own tissues. Compared with healthy individuals, the participants showed high activity of proteins called type 1 interferons, which switch on pathogen-fighting genes in immune cells.

See also 
 Equestrian perniosis
 Erythrocyanosis crurum
 Raynaud's disease

References

External links 

 
 Cold stress, National Institute for Occupational Safety and Health

Foot diseases
Skin conditions resulting from physical factors
Effects of external causes